Gwilym are a Welsh-language pop rock group from Ynys Môn and Caernarfon. The band consists of members Ifan Pritchard, Llyr Jones, Llew Glyn, Rhys Grail, and Carwyn Williams. The group was founded in 2017.

History 
The band consists of members from across north west Wales, including Caernarfon and Anglesey. The members are currently based at universities in London, Birmingham, and Cardiff, but continue to travel together.

They released their first music video in July 2018, for their single "Fyny Ac Yn Ôl" .

In 2018 the band were named at the Y Selar Awards (organised by contemporary Welsh language music magazine Y Selar) as Best Breakthrough Act. They won again in 2019, securing five awards, including: 

 Band of the Year
 Best Song - Catalunya
 Best Video - Cwîn 
 Best Artwork - Sugno Gola
 Best Album - Sugno Gola

Their 2018 album Sugno Gola  was one of the first Welsh language albums to receive over 100,000 streams on Spotify. The title comes from the lyrics "Sugno gola, chwythu mwg"  which appears in the song, "Llechen Lan" . 

They performed at the Maes Stage at the 2018 Urdd Eisteddfod in Cardiff and the  Ultimate World Festival, Aberdaron. They have toured venues in London, Cardiff, Aberystwyth, Carmarthen, and Llanrwst (for the Eisteddfod).

The band are inspired by artists including Muse, Super Furry Animals, Circa Waves, and Candelas, and were involved in the launch of magazine Lysh Cymru at the Urdd Eisteddfod 2019.

They were named by BBC Cymru Wales and the Arts Council of Wales in the 2019 lineup for the Horizons Gorwelion annual festival.

Discography

Studio albums

Singles

Awards

References

External links 

 
 

Welsh rock music groups
Musical groups established in 2017
Welsh indie rock groups
Articles needing translation from Welsh Wikipedia

2017 establishments in Wales
Welsh-language bands